The members of the 16th General Assembly of Newfoundland were elected in the Newfoundland general election held in November 1889. The general assembly sat from 1890 to 1893.

The Liberal Party led by William Whiteway formed the government.

George Emerson was chosen as speaker.

Sir Terence O'Brien served as colonial governor of Newfoundland.

Members of the Assembly 
The following members were elected to the assembly in 1889:

Notes:

By-elections 
By-elections were held to replace members for various reasons:

Notes:

References 

Terms of the General Assembly of Newfoundland and Labrador